KITV (channel 4) is a television station in Honolulu, Hawaii, United States, serving the Hawaiian Islands as an affiliate of ABC. It is owned by Allen Media Group alongside multicultural independent station KIKU (channel 20). The two stations share studios on South King Street in downtown Honolulu; KITV's main transmitter is located atop the Ala Moana Hotel in Honolulu.

History
The station signed on the air on April 16, 1954, as KULA-TV, launching at 10:30 a.m. with a test pattern, followed by its inaugural sign-on premiere party at 6 p.m., and two movies from 7 p.m. to 9:45 p.m. Prior to its launch, it had planned to use the call letters KABS-TV before settling on the KULA calls, which came from its then sister AM station under the ownership of Pacific Frontier Broadcasting Company, whose owner Jack A. Burnett had applied for a TV license to operate KULA on channel 2 as the channel 4 allocation was being sought after by rival radio stations KGU and KPOA, but after the application by the two stations fell through the FCC awarded the channel 4 allocation to Burnett instead. The station has been an ABC affiliate since its sign-on, making KITV one of the two major television stations in Honolulu that has never changed its network affiliation; local CBS outlet KGMB (originally on channel 9, now on channel 5) is the other. They are also the only station in Hawaii to broadcast in the same channel position since its sign-on. It also shared programming from DuMont with KONA (then at channel 11, now KHON-TV on channel 2), until its demise in 1955.

Originally, the KHVH-TV calls belonged to a then-independent station that operated on VHF channel 13 in Honolulu when it began operations on May 5, 1957, but a year later on May 7, 1958, KHVH's parent company Kaiser Broadcasting would acquire KULA for $685,000. Since FCC rules prohibit a broadcaster from owning two TV stations in one market at the time, Kaiser returned the channel 13 license back to the FCC, allowing KHVH to merge with KULA on July 16, 1958, and change the channel 4 call letters to KHVH-TV in 1959. Kaiser then later sold the station to Western Telestations in December 1964 to help fund its new chain of independent stations on the U.S. mainland. Western Telestations became a wholly owned subsidiary of Lexington, Kentucky–based Starr Broadcasting Company in 1973 for $4 million. Around that time, the station adopted its present-day KITV call letters (standing for "Island Television") to reflect its service of broadcasting to the Hawaiian Islands.

Shamrock Broadcasting, a new company founded by Roy E. Disney, bought out Starr Broadcasting (including KITV) in 1979. Eight years later, Shamrock sold KITV to Tak Communications (owned by Sharad Tak) in 1987. Tak would declare Chapter 11 bankruptcy in 1991 and was later taken over by a group of creditors. During Tak's bankruptcy, Freedom Communications made an offer to purchase KITV, but later withdrew its bid. In 1995, rumors circulated that it would join NBC when KHON—which had been Hawaii's NBC affiliate for 43 years (from its sign-on in 1952 until 1996)—decided to join Fox as part of a groupwide affiliation deal with SF Broadcasting (which acquired the station and three others from Burnham Broadcasting). However, later in 1995, Argyle Television Holdings II bought KITV and then-sister station WGRZ-TV in Buffalo, New York from Tak's creditors. KITV ultimately remained with ABC, and NBC instead signed an affiliation deal with existing Fox affiliate KHNL (channel 13), later switching to the network in January 1996.

When Argyle Television Holdings II merged with the Hearst Corporation's broadcasting unit in 1997, KITV and its satellites became part of the newly formed television station group then known as Hearst-Argyle Television. In 1998, the station moved its operations from its longtime studios on Ala Moana Boulevard/Route 92 to their current location on South King Street. Hearst bought out the remainder of the company in mid-2009, dropping the word "Argyle" from the company's name.

On May 13, 2015, Hearst announced that it would sell KITV and its satellites to SJL Broadcasting; the deal marks the return of the company to Hawaii, as SJL (then known as Montecito Broadcast Group) formerly owned KHON-TV from 2006 until 2007. The sale was approved by the Federal Communications Commission on July 10, 2015 and completed on September 1, 2015.

On April 13, 2017, the FCC announced that KITV would relocate its physical channel to 20 on April 3, 2019 as a result of the broadcast incentive auction.

The sale of KITV to Los Angeles–based Allen Media Group, owned by Byron Allen, was announced on August 17, 2020, for $30 million. The sale was completed on January 20, 2021.

Programming
In its early days, KITV and its predecessors aired most of the ABC offerings on a one-week delay due to Hawaii's geographical location and at times would receive most of the network shows via air mail. Because of this, the station would program ABC daytime shows from 8 a.m. to 1 p.m. in incorrect order (with movies rounding out most of the schedule), ABC prime time shows from 6:30 to 10:30 p.m., again out of pattern (and at times, delayed to weekends) and mixed in with syndicated programs to fill in the slots, and aired ABC's Saturday morning children's program lineup early (between 5 and 6 a.m., with a few shows not cleared or delayed). Like most of the Honolulu stations, the network newscast would be delayed as late as midnight as the broadcasts were flown in from the mainland after their airings on the East Coast. This began to change on November 19, 1966, when channel 4 KHVH began broadcasting the first live network satellite telecast from the U.S. mainland to Hawaii as ABC fed a football game between Notre Dame and Michigan State to the station via the Lani Bird satellite. Today, KITV receives ABC shows on the same day as the rest of the United States, including live news, sports coverage, and special events. On February 28, 2016, KITV began airing the Academy Awards live for the first time after delaying the telecast for decades, citing the impact of social media reporting the winners in real-time, making it difficult to delay the broadcast for Hawaiian viewers. On February 27, 2017, the station aired that year's ceremony on a tape-delay once again. On February 24, 2019, the station once again aired the Oscars live. The 2020 telecast would mark the first time the station didn't air a repeat or delayed broadcast.
 
KITV clears the entire ABC network programming schedule. The only recent exception was for Power Rangers, which was part of the now-defunct ABC Kids block until August 28, 2010. Most (if not all) ABC affiliates owned by Hearst Television (which once owned KITV) refused to clear the show due to its lack of educational and informational content. In the past, KITV also preempted some of ABC's daytime programming, which instead aired on then-independent station KAAH-TV.

Since its 1954 debut, KITV has produced local shows that ranged from children programs (such as Captain Honolulu and Rocketship 4) to variety programs (like The Aku Show, The Lucky Luck Show, a Don Ho music special, and The Tom Moffatt Show, a local daily version of American Bandstand), as well as its first morning news/talk program (AM Honolulu/The Don Robb Show, which ran from 1970 to 1975), which it continues in the present day. On weekends, KITV airs the locally produced program Ohana Road, which features information and reviews on the latest automobiles as well as coverage of local car enthusiast events, and Soul Sessions, which showcases local Hawaiian musical acts. Another KITV-produced show, Mixed Plate, a lifestyle/travel/cultural/entertainment program hosted by KITV anchorwoman Pamela Young, airs on both KITV-DT2 every Sunday and on the main channel during various timeslots whenever live feeds from ABC finish early or in some cases if technical problems with the satellite feed occur. Mixed Plate was also KITV's longest-running locally produced series, debuting in 1984. The series ended its run in 2016 after Young left the station to join KHON.

KITV was also well known throughout Hawaii as the long-time presenter of the Merrie Monarch Festival, which was broadcast on the station live every April from Hilo for many years until 2009. During its coverage of the festival, KITV usually preempted ABC prime time programs until the weekend. On October 1, 2009, it was announced that the Merrie Monarch Festival would be broadcast on KFVE beginning in 2010.

KITV along with the then-owner Hearst's sister stations refused to carry a showing of Saving Private Ryan, opting it out for a showing of the 1992 movie Far and Away in November 2004.

News operation
From the beginning, KULA started building a small but innovative news department with the launching of its first newscast featuring John Needham. But under the ownership of Kaiser, this would later expand with the pairing of John Galbraith and then-production manager Bob Sevey, who would go on to be one of Hawaii's best-remembered news teams. On October 15, 1959, KHVH would become the first station in Hawaii to show same-day news images from film and photography during its newscasts (its competitors at the time took two days to have their film and photographs processed). It also expanded its Sports department presence in the 1960s with Kaiser Sports Central, a weekly round-up of sporting reports around the Islands.

Currently, KITV presently broadcasts 29 hours of locally produced newscasts each week; the station also carries an afternoon newscast weekdays at 12 Noon local time as of August 2018. KITV has won a Regional Emmy Award for the best newscast in the state.

In addition to ABC NewsOne, KITV also has a news feed affiliation with CNN, which used KITV's live broadband stream to report on a magnitude-6.6 earthquake that struck off the northwestern coast of Hawaii County on October 15, 2006. Since KITV was the only station in Hawaii to air live coverage of the earthquake after the event (most other stations in Honolulu continued on with their normal morning programming that day), it also attracted a flood of phone calls and e-mails from people worldwide trying to find out if their loved ones were safe. The live stream also attracted the attention of The Daily Show the following day (October 16), due in part to a building manager mentioning via a public address system that the building's bathrooms were still operational while the news anchors were still on the air.

On November 16, 2009, KITV expanded its 10:00 p.m. newscast to one hour; KITV was one of a handful of ABC stations across the country that carried an hour-long late evening newscast. Because of this, Jimmy Kimmel Live! was broadcast on a 25-minute delay weeknights at 11 p.m. local time. This practice ended on September 24, 2018, when KITV reverted its 10 p.m. newscast to 35 minutes, allowing Jimmy Kimmel Live! to air in its normal timeslot. On September 7, 2010, the station started Hawaii's only weekend morning newscast, from 6 to 8 a.m. on Saturday and Sunday mornings.

On April 18, 2011, starting with its 5:00 p.m. newscast, KITV began broadcasting its news programming from the station's newsroom while construction of a new news set was being done in the station's main news studio. Ten days later on April 28, the station unveiled the new set, along with updated graphics and music, and also began broadcasting its local newscasts in widescreen standard definition; the majority of live field reports and video footage is also broadcast in widescreen. In April 2013, KITV expanded its 6:00 p.m. newscast to one hour, making it the only station in Hawaii to air an hour-long newscast in this time period.

Notable former on-air staff
 Chuck Henry – anchor (1969–1972, later at KNBC in Los Angeles; now retired)
 Kanoa Leahey – weekend sports anchor/sports reporter (now at KHON-TV)
 Al Michaels – sports anchor (1968–1970, later with ABC Sports, now with NBC Sports and Amazon)
 Tina Shelton – anchor/reporter

Technical information

Subchannels
The station's digital signal is multiplexed:

KITV previously carried a weather information channel on 4.2 called "Weather Now", which featured programming from The Local AccuWeather Channel with local cut-ins by KITV weather anchors. The channel featured local weather forecasts, a news ticker and live traffic cameras, in addition to national programming provided by AccuWeather.

On October 4, 2010, about two months after Hearst sister stations KCRA-TV and KSBW started broadcasting an alternate set of programming over on their second digital subchannels, KITV replaced "Weather Now" programming during the 6 to 11 p.m. timeslot with "More TV Hawaii", a channel modeled after its Tampa sister station WMOR-TV and operated as an independent station-style service that featured first-run shows, reruns of sitcoms and dramas, and current syndicated KITV programs. KITV digital channel 4.2 also joined KHON's second subchannel as the only outlets in Hawaii to feature general entertainment programming on their digital subchannels.

On November 14, 2011, KITV replaced "Weather Now" and "More TV Hawaii" with MeTV; MeTV programming on KITV is electronically delayed for the Hawaii Time Zone, following the network's Eastern Time schedule.

In December 2018, Start TV was added to 4.4 and H&I to 4.5.

Analog-to-digital conversion
KITV discontinued regular programming on its analog signal, over VHF channel 4, on January 15, 2009, the date in which full-power television stations in Hawaii transitioned from analog to digital broadcasts (almost five months earlier than the June 12 transition date for stations on the U.S. mainland). This makes KITV the first of the Hearst-owned stations to make the digital transition (WPTZ and WNNE made the transition on the 17th, which was the original transition date on the mainland, while the rest of Hearst's stations waited until June 12 to switch to digital). The station's digital signal remained on its pre-transition UHF channel 40, using PSIP to display the station's virtual channel as its former VHF analog channel 4.

At the same time, KHVO's digital signal relocated from its pre-transition UHF channel 18 to VHF channel 13 (which was also its former analog channel—but KHVO switched to channel 4 as its virtual channel), while KMAU's digital signal relocated from its pre-transition UHF channel 29 to VHF channel 12 (its original analog channel) for post-transition digital operations. KITV and its satellites were one of the first Hearst-owned stations to terminate their analog signals.

Satellite stations
As with other major television stations in Hawaii, KITV operates multiple satellite stations and translators across the Hawaiian Islands to rebroadcast the station's programming outside of metropolitan Honolulu.

Notes:
1 KHVO used the call sign KHJK from its 1960 sign-on until October 15, 1964. 
2 KMAU used the call sign KMVI-TV from its 1955 sign-on to 1978.

Cable dispute
On July 9, 2012, KITV's parent company Hearst Television was involved in a dispute with Time Warner Cable, leading to KITV being pulled from Oceanic Time Warner and temporarily replaced with other cable channels that were offered by the system. The dispute lasted until July 19, 2012, when the deal was reached between Hearst and Time Warner.

References

External links
KITV.com – KITV official website 
SBTV.com livestream of KITV-DT3

ITV
ABC network affiliates
MeTV affiliates
Start TV affiliates
Entertainment Studios
Heroes & Icons affiliates
Kaiser Broadcasting
Television channels and stations established in 1954
1954 establishments in Hawaii
Regional Emmy Award winners